Trachypollia is a genus of sea snails, marine gastropod mollusks in the family Muricidae, the murex snails or rock snails.

The classification of this genus is doubtful.

Species
Species within the genus Trachypollia include:
 Trachypollia didyma (Schwengel, 1943)
 Trachypollia lugubris (C.B. Adams, 1852)
 Trachypollia sclera Woodring, 1928
 Trachypollia turricula (Maltzan, 1884)
Species brought into synonymy
 Trachypollia nodulosa Adams: synonym of Morula nodulosa (C. B. Adams, 1845)

References

External links
 Woodring W.P.B. (1928). Miocene mollusks from Bowden, Jamaica. 2. Gastropods and discussion of results. Carnegie Institution of Washington Publication. 385: vii + 564 pp., 40 pls
 Emerson, W.K. & Hertlein, L.G. (1964) Invertebrate megafossils of the Belvedere Expedition to the Gulf of California. Transactions of the San Diego Society of Natural History, 13, 333–368.
 Radwin G. & D'Attilio A. (1972). The systematics of some New World muricid species (Mollusca, Gastropoda), with description of two new genera and two new species. Proceedings of the Biological Society of Washington. 85(28): 323-352